John Edward Walsh (4 December 1912 – 20 May 1980) was an Australian cricketer who played nearly all of his cricket in England.

An aggressive late-order left-handed batsman and a bowler of slow left-arm wrist-spin and googlies (of two varieties), Walsh was brought out of Australian club cricket in 1936 to play as one of the professionals in the side taken by the Nottinghamshire cricket impresario Sir Julien Cahn to tour Sri Lanka. Cahn's sides played some first-class matches on this and other tours and in English seasons across the 1930s and over the next three years, Walsh took more than 600 wickets for Cahn's sides, touring New Zealand in 1938-39 and playing three seasons in England. He also played a few county matches as an amateur for Leicestershire.

In 1946, with Cahn having died, Walsh returned to England and became for the next 10 years a professional with Leicestershire, regularly being the county's highest wicket-taker and enlivening many innings with a robust approach to batting. He took more than 100 wickets in seven of those seasons and his total of 170 wickets in 1948 is still the Leicestershire county record for a single season. In 1952, he also scored 1106 runs, to complete the all-rounder's double for the season. He bowled left-handed wrist spin, with two googlies: "one, which could easily be detected, to lull the batsman into a sense of security, when he would unleash the other, which was calculated to deceive even the greatest batsmen".

He retired after the 1956 season and later coached Tasmania and Scotland. He also coached Oxford University in 1955.
  
Walsh played only two first-class matches in Australia, both for New South Wales in the 1939-40 season.

References

External links

1912 births
1980 deaths
Leicestershire cricketers
New South Wales cricketers
Players cricketers
Sir Julien Cahn's XI cricketers
H. D. G. Leveson Gower's XI cricketers
North v South cricketers
T. N. Pearce's XI cricketers
Non-international England cricketers